Dream Scenario is an upcoming American comedy film written and directed by Kristoffer Borgli. It stars Nicolas Cage, Michael Cera, Julianne Nicholson, and Tim Meadows. It is produced by Ari Aster and Lars Knudsen under their Square Peg banner, alongside Jacob Jaffke and Tyler Campellone.

Plot 
A schlubby professor who never made it becomes an overnight celebrity after appearing in everyone's dream.

Cast 
 Nicolas Cage 
 Michael Cera
 Julianne Nicholson 
 Tim Meadows
 Kate Berlant 
 Dylan Baker
 Dylan Gelula

Production 
In August 2022, A24 announced Dream Scenario which was written and directed by Kristoffer Borgli with Nicolas Cage, Julianne Nicholson, Michael Cera, Tim Meadows, Kate Berlant, Dylan Baker, and Dylan Gelula all starring in the film. Ari Aster and Lars Knudsen are set to produce the film.

Filming
Principal photography commenced in Toronto in October 2022 and wrapped that November.

Release
Dream Scenario is set to be released by A24.

References

External links 
 

Upcoming films
Upcoming English-language films
American comedy films
A24 (company) films
2020s American films